Aero Synergie SARL, also called ULM Synergy SARL, is a French aircraft manufacturer based in Villefrancœur. The company specializes in the design and manufacture of light aircraft and kit aircraft.

Formed in November 2009, the company took over the assets of Sauper/ALMS, including its J300 Joker and Papango aircraft designs. These aircraft are now out of production, but Aero Synergie continues to produce parts for the J300. The company produces the Sky Ranger and also acts as distributor for the Zenair line of Canadian light aircraft kits and the ICP Savannah series.

Aircraft

References

External links

Aircraft manufacturers of France
Companies based in Centre-Val de Loire